Nicolae Mătcaş (born 27 April 1940) is a Moldovan politician. He was the Minister of Education in the Mircea Druc Cabinet.

Biography 

Nicolae Mătcaş was born on 27 April 1940 in Crihana Veche. He served as Minister of Education in Mircea Druc Cabinet (1990–1994). After 1995 Nicolae Mătcaş worked for the Ministry of Education, Research, Youth and Sport (Romania) in Bucharest.

Works 
 "Surâsul Giocondei". Ed. Didactică şi Pedagogică, București, 1997.
 "Trenul cu un singur pasager". Ed. Didactică şi Pedagogică, București, 1998.
 "Azur". Ed. "Augusta", Timişoara, 2002.
 "Câte-s visele, multele…". Ed. "Pro Transilvania", București, 2003.
 "Coloana infinitului". Ed. "Pro Transilvania"; București, 2003.
 "De-a alba – neagra". Ed. Muzeul Literaturii Române, București, 2006.
 "Roată de olar. Sonete". Ed. "Pro Transilvania", București, 2008.
 "Vernale ploi". Ed. "Pro Transilvania", București, 2008.

Bibliography
 Nicolae Mătcaş (la 60 de ani). În : " Calendar naţional 2000 ", Chişinău, 2000, pp. 127–130.
 Nicolae Mătcaş. În : "Enciclopedia marilor personalităţi. Din istoria, ştiinţa şi cultura românească de-a lungul timpului şi de pretutindeni. Vol. V. Contemporanii, K–Z.". Ed. "Geneze", Fundaţia Realitatea Românească, București, 2003, pp. 76–79.
 Tudor Opriş. "Inimi de peste Prut". În cartea : Tudor Opriş. Chipuri în bronz. Evocări, II. Ed. Pro Transilvania, București, 2005, pp. 98–106.
 Nicolae Mătcaş : În : Aurel Sasu. Dicţionarul biografic al literaturii române, vol. II (M-Z). Ed. Paralela 45., Piteşti, 2006, pp. 82–83.

External links 
 NICOLAE MĂTCAŞ
 Profesorul Nicolae Mătcaş la 70 de ani

References

Romanian people of Moldovan descent
Living people
1940 births
People from Cahul District
Moldova State University alumni
Moldovan journalists
Male journalists
Moldovan writers
Moldovan male writers
Popular Front of Moldova politicians
Recipients of the Order of the Republic (Moldova)